Personopsis is a genus of medium-sized sea snails, marine gastropod mollusks in the family Personidae, the Distortio snails.

Species
Species within the genus Personopsis include:
 † Personopsis alvaradoi (Villalta, 1956) †
 † Personopsis beui (P. A. Maxwell, 1968) 
 Personopsis ednafarinasae Parth, 2006
 Personopsis grasi (Bellardi in d'Ancona, 1872)
 † Personopsis interposita (Tate, 1894) 
 † Personopsis minae (de Gregorio, 1880) 
 Personopsis purpurata Beu, 1998
 † Personopsis rutoti (Vincent, 1930) 
 Personopsis trigonaperta Beu, 1998
Synonym:
 Personopsis ednafarinasi Parth, 2006: synonym of Personopsis ednafarinasae Parth, 2006 (wrongly formed genitive: named after a woman)

References

External links
 Beu, A. G. (1988). Taxonomy of gastropods of the families Ranellidae (= Cymatiidae) and Bursidae. Part 5. Early history of the families, with four new genera and recognition of the family Personidae. Saito Ho-on Kai Special Publication. (Prof. T. Kotaka Commemorative volume): 69-96
 Beu A.G. (1998). Résultats des Campagnes MUSORSTOM: 19. Indo-West Pacific Ranellidae, Bursidae and Personidae (Mollusca: Gastropoda), a monograph of the New Caledonian fauna and revisions of related taxa. Mémoires du Muséum National d'Histoire Naturelle. 178: 1-255

Personidae